Cymindis lineata is a species of ground beetle in the family Carabidae. It is found in the Palearctic.

References

lineata
Beetles described in 1806